The Australian Teachers Of Media or ATOM is an independent, not-for-profit, professional association that promotes the study of media and screen literacy. The membership of ATOM includes a collective of educators from across all subject disciplines at all levels of education, the screen media industry and, increasingly, the general public interested in the media. 

The national organisation is responsible for the ATOM Awards that have been presented annually since 1982. The awards celebrate the best of Australian screen content from the education sector and screen industry professionals, and now feature the 1 Minute Film Competition and ATOM Photo Comp.

ATOM publishes Australia's longest running film publication,  Metro Magazine and  Screen Education; creates and distributes education resources including study guides; and hosts professional development for teachers and screenings.

ATOM aims to foster and encourage a generation of students who are both multi-literate and technologically savvy.

Through the publishing of both Metro Magazine  and Screen Education and through convening the ATOM Awards and the ATOM Australian International Multimedia Awards, ATOM actively promotes media literacy in Australia and internationally.

See also
Best Enemies

References

External links 
 ATOM Film, Television and Multimedia Awards ATOM Award website
 Council of ACT Education Associations Description of ATOM activities
 AFC NewsAndEvents Description of the 2004 Awards, including finalists
 Australian Teachers of Media  ATOM Victoria official website
 ATOM Queensland ATOM Queensland website
 ACCC Australian Competition and Consumer Commission Listing
 "ATOM's reach spreads" 2002 article in The Age newspaper

Educational organisations based in Australia
Media studies
Australian film awards
Australian television awards
Video game awards
Awards established in 1982
1982 establishments in Australia
Video gaming in Australia